This Old Heart of Mine is the fourth studio album released by The Isley Brothers in 1966, on the Tamla (Motown) label. The album, their first with the seminal Detroit-based music label, yielded the Isleys' biggest hit in their early period with the title track, "This Old Heart of Mine (Is Weak for You)". Other charted singles including "Take Some Time Out for Love" and "I Guess I'll Always Love You".

Despite the early success of their Motown debut, the Isley Brothers would be alienated from the label because it treated them as a second-string group. They soon left for Buddah Records and reforming their own T-Neck label in 1969, finding long-lasting success soon afterwards.

Track listing

Personnel
The Isley Brothers
Ronald Isley – lead vocals
O'Kelly Isley, Jr. and Rudolph Isley – background vocals (except on "I Hear a Symphony")

With
The Andantes (Jackie Hicks, Marlene Barrow and Louvain Demps) – background vocals on "This Old Heart of Mine (Is Weak for You)" and "There's No Love Left"
The Funk Brothers – instruments

References

External links
 The Isley Brothers - This Old Heart of Mine (1966) album releases & credits at Discogs
 The Isley Brothers - This Old Heart of Mine (1966) album to be listened as stream on Spotify

1966 albums
Tamla Records albums
The Isley Brothers albums
Albums produced by William "Mickey" Stevenson
Albums produced by Brian Holland
Albums produced by Lamont Dozier
Albums recorded at Hitsville U.S.A.
Albums produced by Robert Gordy